Laure Junot, Duchess of Abrantès (née de Permond; 6 November 17847 June 1838) was a French writer. She was the spouse of French general Jean-Andoche Junot.

Biography
Laure was born as Laure Adélaïde Constance de Permond at Montpellier, the daughter of Charles Martin de Permond and his wife Laure Marie "Panoria" Stefanopoli (or Stephanopoli de Comnène), to whom during her widowhood the young Napoleon Bonaparte made an offer of marriage. Her mother, Panoria, was descended from the Comnene family, the last Greek dynasty from the Empire of Trebizond. The Martin de Permon family, after various vicissitudes, settled at Paris, and Bonaparte certainly frequented their house a good deal after the downfall of the Jacobin party in Thermidor 1794. 

In 1800, Laure married Jean-Andoche Junot (created  Duke of Abrantès, whom she called Alexandre, in 1806). 

They had four children:

 Joséphine Junot d'Abrantès (Paris, 2 January 1802-Paris, 15 October 1888), married in November 1841 to Jacques-Louis Amet (Farnham (Surrey), 17 February 1817-) 

 Constance Marie-Antoinette Junot d'Abrantès (Paris, 9 July 1803-Paris, 22 January 1881), married in 1829 to Louis Antoine Aubert (1799-1882), mariée en 1829 à Louis Antoine Aubert (1799-1882), with issue. 

 Louis Napoléon Andoche Junot, 2nd Duke of Abrantès (Paris, 25 September 1807-Neuilly-sur-Seine, 20 February 1851), died unmarried and without issue. 

 Andoche Alfred Michel Junot, 3rd Duke of Abrantes (Ciudad Rodrigo, Spain, 25 November 1810 - Battle of Solferino, Italy, 24 June 1859), married firstly on April 2, 1845, to Marie Céline Elise Lepic (9 October 1824-6 June 1847), with issue: 

 Jeanne Joséphine Marguerite Junot d'Abrantès (Paris, 22 May 1847-21 March 1934), married in Paris on September 16th 1869 to Xavier Eugène Maurice Le Ray (Sèvres, 15 July 1846-Paris, 1st December 1900). 

He married secondly on January 10th 1853 to Marie Louise Léonie Lepic (19 July 1829-17 August 1868), his first wife's sister, with issue: 

Jérôme Napoléon Andoche Junot d'Abrantès (Paris, 16 June 1854-Paris, 10 March 1857)

Marguerite Louise Elisabeth Junot d'Abrantès (Paris, 25 January 1856-1919), married in Paris on November 11th 1883 to César Elzéar Léon Viscount Arthaud de La Ferrière (1853-1924). 

This was early in the Consulate and she at once entered eagerly into all the gaieties of Paris, and became noted for her beauty, her caustic wit, and her extravagance. The First Consul nicknamed her petite peste, but treated her and Junot with the utmost generosity, a fact which did not restrain her sarcasms and slanders in her portrayal of him in her Memoirs. During Junot's diplomatic mission to Lisbon, his wife so displayed her prodigality, that on his return to Paris in 1806 he was burdened with debts, which his own intrigues did not lessen. She joined him again at Lisbon after he had entered that city as conqueror at the close of 1807; but even the presents and spoils won at Lisbon did not satisfy her demands; she accompanied Junot through part of the Peninsular War.

On her return to France she displeased the emperor by her vivacious remarks and by receiving guests whom he disliked. The mental malady of Junot thereafter threatened her with ruin; this perhaps explains why she took some part in the intrigues for bringing back the Bourbons in 1814. She did not side with Napoleon during the Hundred Days. After 1815 she spent most of her time at Rome amidst artistic society, which she enlivened with her sprightly converse; a monarchist on her return to Paris during the Restoration, she compiled her spirited but somewhat spiteful Memoirs with the encouragement and supervision of Balzac, her lover since 1828.

Ridiculed by Gautier as the "Duchess of Abracadantès" and fallen into poverty, she died in a nursing home in Paris in 1838.

Works
The Memoirs were published at Paris in 1831–1834 in 18 volumes. Many editions have since appeared.

Of her other books the most noteworthy are Histoires contemporaines (2 vols., 1835); Scènes de la vie espagnole (2 vols., 1836); Histoire des salons de Paris (6 vols., 1837–1838); Souvenirs d'une ambassade et d'un séjour en Espagne et en Portugal, de 1808 à 1811 (2 vols., 1837).

Notes

References

Further reading
Alice Acland. The Corsican Ladies (novel). London: Peter Davies Ltd. 1974.

External links
 
 

1784 births
1838 deaths
Writers from Montpellier
French duchesses
French people of Greek descent
French women memoirists
Burials at Montmartre Cemetery
19th-century French memoirists